Raj Bhavan (translation: Government House) is the official residence of the governor of Meghalaya. It is located in the capital city of Shillong, Meghalaya.

See also
  Government Houses of the British Indian Empire

References

External links
Website

Governors' houses in India
Government of Meghalaya
Shillong
Buildings and structures in Meghalaya